Hastings was a federal electoral district represented in the House of Commons of Canada from 1968 to 1979. It was located in the province of Ontario. This riding was created in 1966 from parts of Hastings South and Hastings—Frontenac ridings.

It consisted of the City of Belleville and the Townships of Cashel, Dungannon, Elzevir, Faraday, Grimsthorpe, Hungerford, Huntingdon, Lake, Limerick, Madoc, Marmora, Mayo, Thurlow, Tudor, Tyendinaga and Wollaston in the County of Hastings.

The electoral district was abolished in 1976 when it was redistributed between Prince Edward and Hastings—Frontenac ridings.

Members of Parliament

This riding has elected the following Members of Parliament:

Election results

|}

|}

|}

See also 

 List of Canadian federal electoral districts
 Past Canadian electoral districts

External links 
Riding history from the Library of Parliament

Former federal electoral districts of Ontario